The 1996 Grand Prix de Tennis de Toulouse was a men's tennis tournament played on indoor hard courts at the Palais des Sports de Toulouse in Toulouse, France, and was part of the World Series of the 1996 ATP Tour. It was the 15th edition of the tournament and took place from 14 October through 20 October 1996. Fourth-seeded Mark Philippoussis won the singles title.

Finals

Singles

 Mark Philippoussis defeated  Magnus Larsson 6–1, 5–7, 6–4
 It was Philippoussis' only title of the year and the 3rd of his career.

Doubles

 Jacco Eltingh /  Paul Haarhuis defeated  Olivier Delaître /  Guillaume Raoux, 6–3, 7–5
 It was Eltingh's 1st title of the year and the 31st of his career. It was Haarhuis' 2nd title of the year and the 30th of his career.

References

External links
 ITF tournament edition details

1996 ATP Tour
1996
Grand Prix de Tennis de Toulouse
Grand Prix de Tennis de Toulouse